Kulenkampff is a German surname. Notable people with the surname include:

Georg Kulenkampff (1898–1948), German concert violinist
Hans-Joachim Kulenkampff (1921–1998), German actor, television host and entertainer 
Helmuth Kulenkampff (1895–1971), German physicist

German-language surnames